Jill Bennett (born August 14, 1975 in Fort Wayne, Indiana) is an American actress. She is best known for her role in the 2009 lesbian film And Then Came Lola.

She co-stars on the television series Dante's Cove, as well as 3Way, a lesbian web series.

She has produced two different series, We Have to Stop Now which was shown at Frameline and Outfest LGBT film festivals, and Second Shot, which screened at The Dinah 2013, Outfest and won best feature at LFest in 2013.

Personal life 
Bennett is an out lesbian. She said "There are plenty of lesbians in Hollywood, but they're not out. And that's their choice, but I can't do that, it's too important to me".

Filmography

Television

Other work

References

External links 
 
 

1975 births
Actresses from Indiana
American film actresses
American television actresses
Living people
American lesbian actresses
Actors from Fort Wayne, Indiana
LGBT people from Indiana
21st-century American actresses